Amy Astley (born June 5, 1967) is the editor-in-chief of Architectural Digest as of April 2019. She was editor of Teen Vogue, which launched in January 2003. She was named to edit the new magazine in June 2002 by Anna Wintour, and editorial director of Teen Vogue.

Career
Astley joined Vogue in 1993 and became Beauty Director the following year. Prior to Vogue, Astley was an Associate Editor at House & Garden for four years, after beginning as a decorating assistant in her early 20s. Astley was also the editor of Teen Vogue'''s four test issues, which were published from 2000–2002.

Teen Vogue under Astley's direction
The American Society of Magazine Editors nominated Teen Vogue for a 2003 General Excellence Award in the 250,000-500,000 circulation category. In addition, Teen Vogue was named Adweek magazine's 2004 Startup of the Year. Teen Vogue'''s circulation rate base increased to 900,000 with the October 2006 issue from its previous level of 850,000. The magazine is produced in the new Euro magazine size (6-3/4" x 9-1/8"). Speaking to Forbes on her ten-year vision for Teen Vogue, Astley hoped to master digital domination, saying "We have to keep inspiring, surprising, entertaining and leading our audience on every platform from print to YouTube to the newest, latest innovation."

Personal life
Astley holds a BA in English from the College of Arts and Letters at Michigan State University. She lives in Manhattan with her husband and their two children.

References 

American magazine editors
Women magazine editors
Living people
People from East Lansing, Michigan
Fashion editors
Michigan State University alumni
1969 births
Architectural Digest editors